Below are the squads for the 1994 FIFA World Cup final tournament in the United States. Greece, Italy, Saudi Arabia and Spain were the only countries who had all their players selected from domestic clubs, while the Republic of Ireland and Nigeria had no players from domestic clubs. Saudi Arabia were the only team with no players from European clubs.

The players' age, caps and clubs are as of 16 June 1994 (the tournament started on 17 June).

Group A

Colombia
Head coach:  Francisco Maturana

Romania
Head coach:  Anghel Iordănescu

Switzerland
Head coach:  Roy Hodgson

United States
Head coach:  Bora Milutinović

Note: many of the squad were contracted full-time to US Soccer for the 1993–94 season, as the squad played frequent friendlies in preparation for hosting the tournament.

Group B

Brazil
Head coach:  Carlos Alberto Parreira

Note: Raí captained Brazil in the group stage, before he was dropped and replaced by Dunga.

Cameroon
Head coach:  Henri Michel

Russia
Head coach:  Pavel Sadyrin

Note: caps include those for USSR, CIS, and Russia, while those for other countries, such as Ukraine, are not counted.

Sweden
Head coach:  Tommy Svensson

 Caps as of 10 June 1994

Group C

Bolivia
Head coach:  Xabier Azkargorta

Germany
Head coach:  Berti Vogts

Note: Sammer and Kirsten also earned additional caps for East Germany (23 and 49, respectively).

South Korea
Head coach:  Kim Ho

Spain
Head coach:  Javier Clemente

Group D

Argentina
Head coach:  Alfio Basile

Bulgaria
Head coach:  Dimitar Penev

Greece
Head coach:  Alketas Panagoulias

Nigeria
Head coach:  Clemens Westerhof

Group E

Italy
Head coach:  Arrigo Sacchi

Mexico
Head coach:  Miguel Mejía Barón

Norway
Head coach: Egil Olsen

Republic of Ireland
Head coach:  Jack Charlton

Group F

Belgium
Head coach:  Paul Van Himst

Morocco
Head coach: Abdellah Blinda

Netherlands
Head coach:  Dick Advocaat

Saudi Arabia
Head coach:  Jorge Solari

Notes
Each national team had to submit a squad of 22 players. All the teams included 3 goalkeepers, except Russia, Bulgaria and Republic of Ireland who only called two.

References
 Planet World Cup website
 weltfussball.de 

FIFA World Cup squads
Squads